Ian Williams (born 6 August 1971) is an American former professional tennis player.

Williams played two years of collegiate tennis at Harvard University, before transferring to the University of Texas for his final two seasons. In 1993 he was runner-up to Texas teammate Chad Clark at the ITA All-American Championships and helped the Longhorns win the SWC championships.

On the professional tour, Williams had a best singles world ranking of 638. In doubles he reached a best ranking of 222 and made an ATP Tour main draw appearance at the 1995 Volvo International in New Haven. He also won an ATP Challenger doubles title in 1995, partnering Ivan Baron in Quito.

Following his tennis career, Williams returned to Harvard to complete his economics degree.

ATP Challenger finals

Doubles: 1 (1–0)

References

External links
 
 

1971 births
Living people
American male tennis players
Texas Longhorns men's tennis players
Harvard Crimson men's tennis players
Harvard University alumni